Ahmed Bader Magour (born March 3, 1996) is a Qatari javelin thrower. He competed at the 2016 Summer Olympics in the men's javelin throw; his result of 77.19 meters in the qualifying round did not qualify him for the final.

Seasonal bests by year

2015 - 77.88
2016 - 84.74
2017 - 85.23
2022 - 74.28

References

External links
 

1996 births
Living people
Qatari male athletes
Male javelin throwers
Olympic athletes of Qatar
Athletes (track and field) at the 2016 Summer Olympics
Athletes (track and field) at the 2018 Asian Games
Asian Games competitors for Qatar